Great Lakes Aircraft Company is an aircraft manufacturer known for the 2T-1A Sport Trainer biplane. The company has a long history of building both private and military aircraft.

Origins 
In 1929, the Great Lakes Aircraft Company (GLAC) was formed in Cleveland, Ohio at the former site of the Martin Aircraft Company. They built civilian biplanes, float planes, as well as biplane torpedo bombers and dive bombers under contract to the US Navy. In 1933 the Company was reportedly working on a steam power plant for driving aircraft turbines.

Great Lakes Trophy
The Great Lakes Trophy was awarded in 1930 and 1931 to the fastest plane with an engine of 510 cubic inches or less that participated in the National Air Tour.

2T biplane
The model that most people think of today when someone says, "Great Lakes aircraft," is the enduring 2T biplane; also known as the Great Lakes Sport Trainer.  It was designed and sold as a two-place, open cockpit biplane. The first engines were an 85 hp (63 kW) American Cirrus III. The 2T biplane was not as large as some of its contemporaries manufactured by Stearman, WACO and Travel Air.

The original models had a wing span of 26 feet 8 inches and length of 20 feet 4 inches. The useful load was 578 pounds (262 kg) and it was stressed for 9 g positive and 6 G negative. It had outrigger landing gear with spring oleo shock struts, and the range was 375 miles. The sale price started out at $4,990 dollars but as the depression came it was lowered to $3,985. The first four Sport Trainers built were of a rare straight-wing design, one of which was modified into a special racer. Because of problems recovering from flat spins, the top wing was swept back and that is what most people recognize first when looking at a Sport Trainer. At its peak, Great Lakes had as many as 650 deposits for new aircraft. With the onset of the great depression, the Great Lakes Aircraft Company went out of business closing their doors in 1936. The company built just 264 of the Sport Trainers ordered. The remaining stock of aircraft parts, as well as a complete set of drawings, were purchased at a bankruptcy sale by Charles E. Smith of Willoughby, Ohio.

Aerobatic planes 
As the years went by, the original Cirrus engine installation was replaced by Warner radials, inline Menascos or Fairchild-Rangers, and horizontally-opposed Lycomings, Franklins, or Continentals. Tex Rankin, a stunt pilot of the 1930s and 1940s, made the Great Lakes Sport Trainer famous. He had one specially modified and installed a 150 hp supercharged Menasco engine. It was painted red, white and blue with his name upright on one side, and upside down in the other, so folks would know who he was when he flew by upside down. Tex's airplane is being restored by the Oregon Aviation Museum.

For about 30 years, until the late 1960s, the Great Lakes Sport Trainer was the top American-made acro plane. Other pilots who made the Great Lakes reputation famous were: Hal Krier, Hank Kennedy, Bob "Tiger" Nance, Lindsay Parsons, Dorothy Hester, Betty Skelton, Charley Hillard, and Frank Price. The first United States entry in a world aerobatics contest was a Great Lakes biplane that Frank Price of Texas took to Eastern Europe in 1960.

Re-establishment of the company 
During the 1960s Harvey Swack of Cleveland, Ohio, obtained the rights to the Sport Trainer design and all the factory drawings for it. Harvey then sold plans to homebuilders until 1990, when he sold off the plans business to Steen Aero Lab of Palm Bay, Florida. There have been a great number homebuilt Great Lakes Sport Trainers built over the years, which kept interest in this old biplane alive.

In 1973 Doug Champlin brought the Great Lakes back into production in Oklahoma. The general design was not changed much. The fuselage was strengthened by using thicker walled tubing, and the engines used were 150 or 180 hp Lycomings. The wings utilized Douglas Fir in place of Sitka Spruce, and on some models, additional ailerons were added to the top wing. 137 airframes were produced.  Doug Champlin also built one Turbine powered Great Lakes 2T.  With 420 hp (310 kW), it was quite a show stopper.

In 1978 Dean Franklin bought Champlin's interest in Great Lakes and the factory, inventory and several airframes in various stages of completion were moved to Eastman, Georgia. Franklin completed the in process airframes and then built serial numbers 1001 through 1010. Franklin still owns serial number 1001. Franklin sold Great Lakes to a group in New England and they went out of business in 1983.

In 2000, John Duncan of Palmer Lake, Colorado, bought the Great Lakes Sport Trainer type certificate and tooling. In 2006 Duncan announced his plan to bring the Sport Trainer back into production once again. When he gets 10 airplane orders, the factory will begin production. Duncan's company today is called The Great Lakes Aircraft Company LLC.

Aircraft

References

External links

 Great Lakes Aircraft Company

Aircraft manufacturers of the United States
Manufacturing companies based in Cleveland
Manufacturing companies based in Colorado
El Paso County, Colorado